Bachmanville is an unincorporated community in northeastern Conewago Township, Dauphin County, Pennsylvania, United States and is part of the Harrisburg-Carlisle Metropolitan Statistical Area.

Bachmanville was named for a family of settlers.

References

External links 
Bachmanville Profile

Unincorporated communities in Dauphin County, Pennsylvania
Harrisburg–Carlisle metropolitan statistical area
Unincorporated communities in Pennsylvania